New Lexington High School is a public high school in New Lexington, Ohio, United States. It is the only high school in the New Lexington City School District. Their mascot is the Panthers.

Sports

Football
The football program, currently headed by Coach Kevin Board, has historically played well. Reaching the playoffs seven times, the program won the 1970 state championship and reached the quarterfinals in 2006. And the state semifinals in 2008.

The legendary football coach Jim Rockwell built the program from the 1959 through the 1976 seasons. His record during that time period was 144-27-8. The Panthers won two state championships and 10 MVL championships in the 18 years with Rockwell at the helm. In 1970 Coach Rockwell was voted the Ohio Class AA Coach of the Year and his son Jim “Little Rock” Rockwell was voted the Ohio Class AA Back of the Year as the Panthers won the 1970 Class AA State Championship. In 1984 New Lexington Stadium was re-named Jim Rockwell Stadium in honor of the legendary coach.

Athletics
In 1989 the New Lexington boys' athletics team won the Muskingum Valley League Championship and included several individual league champions, one of whom qualified for state competition. The team had gone undefeated in the league throughout the season.

The following year's team also won the championship without being defeated. Two individuals and a relay team qualified for state competition.

Notable alumni
 Mell G. Underwood, politician, judge

External links
 District Website

High schools in Perry County, Ohio
Public high schools in Ohio
New Lexington, Ohio